The Serie B 1995–96 was the sixty-fourth tournament of this competition played in Italy since its creation.

Teams
Bologna, Pistoiese, Reggina and Avellino had been promoted from Serie C, while Genoa, Foggia, Reggiana and Brescia had been relegated from Serie A.

Final classification

Results

Top goalscorers 

Serie B seasons
2
Italy